Ingvard Nielsen (6 July 1925 – 16 May 2010) was a Danish middle-distance runner. He competed in the men's 1500 metres at the 1948 Summer Olympics.

References

External links

1925 births
2010 deaths
Athletes (track and field) at the 1948 Summer Olympics
Danish male middle-distance runners
Olympic athletes of Denmark
20th-century Danish people